A URL is a uniform resource locator for a Web resource.

URL may also refer to:

 .url, file extension for Internet shortcut files
 URL redirection
 Ultimate Rap League, a battle rap group from New York City
 Unrestricted line officer, in the US Navy
 Upper reference limit
 Upper rostral length, of a cephalopod beak
 Urali language (ISO 639-3: url)
 University Ramon Llull, university in Barcelona
 Url, an ankylosaurus in the 2000 Disney animated film Dinosaur

See also
 UERL, Underground Electric Railways Company of London